The Gruen Trophy is a Canadian Football League trophy, formerly given to the most outstanding Canadian rookie in the East Division. The award, sponsored by the Gruen Watch Co. and inaugurated in 1946, was discontinued and the trophy retired in 1973, as the CFL chose to award the Schenley Award to the best rookie, regardless of nationality.

Prior to 1959, rookie players who were Canadian and had played only junior or high school football were eligible. This was changed to include university athletes when future Hall-of-Famer Russ Jackson, a graduate of McMaster University, began his career but did not win the award.

Winners

 1972 – Bob Richardson (OL), Hamilton Tiger-Cats
 1971 – Jim Foley (SB), Montreal Alouettes
 1970 – Jim Corrigall (DL), Toronto Argonauts
 1969 – Al Phaneuf (DB), Montreal Alouettes
 1968 – Dave Knechtel (DL), Toronto Argonauts
 1967 – Wayne Giardino (LB), Ottawa Rough Riders
 1966 – Mike Wadsworth (DL), Toronto Argonauts
 1965 – Terry Evanshen (WR), Montreal Alouettes
 1964 – Al Irwin (WR), Montreal Alouettes
 1963 – Rick Black (P/FB), Ottawa Rough Riders
 1962 – Whit Tucker (WR), Ottawa Rough Riders
 1961 – Gino Berretta (OE/P), Montreal Alouettes
 1960 – Bill Mitchell (G/LB), Toronto Argonauts
 1959 – Joe Poirier (DB), Ottawa Rough Riders
 1958 – Ron Brewer (LB), Toronto Argonauts
 1957 – Gary W.C. Williams (HB), Toronto Argonauts
 1956 – Tommy Grant (RB), Hamilton Tiger-Cats
 1955 – Ed Mularchyk (E), Ottawa Rough Riders
 1954 – Ron Howell (WR), Hamilton Tiger-Cats
 1953 – Bob Dawson (RB), Hamilton Tiger-Cats
 1952 – John Fedosoff (RB), Toronto Argonauts
 1951 – Bruno Bitkowski (C/DE) Ottawa Rough Riders
 1950 – Bob McDonald (RB), Hamilton Tiger-Cats
 1949 – Jim Loreno (HB), Hamilton Wildcats
 1948 – Keith English (E), Montreal Alouettes
 1947 – Nelson Greene (FB), Ottawa Rough Riders
 1946 – Bernie Brennan (HB), Ottawa Rough Riders

Notes

References
 Hamilton Tiger-Cats website
 Canadian Football Hall of Fame website

Defunct Canadian Football League trophies and awards